Dave Wright (born 9 October 1951) is a former South African ultramarathon athlete. He won 5 gold medals in the Comrades Marathon, the world's largest and oldest ultramarathon, and 3 gold medals in the Two Oceans Marathon. Despite not winning either event, he gained renown and is still famous in running circles as Dancing Dave Wright due to his tradition of finishing all Comrades with "something between a tango and a waltz" followed by a cartwheel across the finishing line.

Background
Dave Wright was born and raised in Johannesburg, South Africa, where he attended St John's College, from where he matriculated in 1968. After high-school he spent one year at Stellenbosch University but returned to Johannesburg after only a year, entering Wits University. It was during his time at Wits that Dave first began to run competitively, including his first two Comrades in 1973 and 1974.

After completing his undergraduate, he moved to Durban and joined Savages Athletic Club, with whom he would achieve his greatest success. After four years in Durban, he returned again to Johannesburg, running for a while with Old Edwardians and later Rand Athletic Club.

Comrades Marathon
The Comrades Marathon is the event in which Dave Wright established his reputation as a serious ultramarathon runner and etched his name into the lore of South African running as Dancing Dave Wright with his finishing line routine. He won five gold medals between 1977 and 1982, with a personal best placing of second, and completed ten races. For both these achievements he has earned his Comrades Marathon number of 2390 in perpetuity, a green number

However, what sets him apart from all other Comrades runners was his habit of finishing at the front of the field of the 90 km (56 mile) race with a "waltz" and a cartwheel over the line, something that all-time race-win record holder, Bruce Fordyce, recently placed as number 4 on his list of 10 Best Comrades Moments, writing that while he could "scarcely hobble at the finish...his (Dave's) gymnastic display was always worth at least a 9.75 for the Olympic floor exercise."

The Dance
His routine would begin approximately 50 meters out from the finishing line, when he would hold his arms out to his sides at shoulder height while alternately swinging one leg behind the other and continuing to run. Just before the finish he would launch into a cartwheel that took him across the line. In 1978 he cartwheeled over the line in 2nd position directly into the formally dressed lady mayor of Durban (see photo - "surprise").

Results

Two Oceans Marathon
In addition to the Comrades, Dave also performed well in South Africa's other major ultramarathon, the 56 km Two Oceans Marathon. He completed the event 6 times between 1973 and 1983, placing in the top-10 on five occasions.

References

Living people
South African male long-distance runners
1951 births
Alumni of St John's College (Johannesburg)
South African ultramarathon runners
Male ultramarathon runners